Aiden Maher (born 1 December 1946) is a footballer who played as a winger in the Football League for Everton, Plymouth Argyle and Tranmere Rovers.

References

1946 births
Living people
Footballers from Liverpool
Association football wingers
English footballers
Everton F.C. players
Plymouth Argyle F.C. players
Tranmere Rovers F.C. players
Bath City F.C. players
English Football League players